Jung Keun-Hee  (born 8 December 1988) is a South Korean footballer who plays as a defender for the Chunnam Dragons in the K-League. He joined the Dragons in 2011.

References

External links 

1988 births
Living people
Association football defenders
South Korean footballers
Jeonnam Dragons players
K League 1 players